A partial solar eclipse occurred on August 31, 1989. A solar eclipse occurs when the Moon passes between Earth and the Sun, thereby totally or partly obscuring the image of the Sun for a viewer on Earth. A partial solar eclipse occurs in the polar regions of the Earth when the center of the Moon's shadow misses the Earth.

Related eclipses

Eclipses of 1989 
 A total lunar eclipse on February 20.
 A partial solar eclipse on March 7.
 A total lunar eclipse on August 17.
 A partial solar eclipse on August 31.

Solar eclipses of 1986–1989

Metonic series

References

External links 

1989 8 31
1989 in science
1989 8 31
August 1989 events